A constable is a person holding a particular office, most commonly in law enforcement.

Constable may also refer to:

People
 Constable (surname), including 
John Constable (1776–1837), the English painter

Places
 Constable, New York, United States
 Constable Bay, Greenland

Other uses
 "Constables", a song by O.C. from his 1994 album Word...Life
 The Constable, a 2013 Hong Kong film
 Dichorragia nesimachus, the constable butterfly

See also
 Constable & Robinson, publishers